Amighetti is an Italian surname. Notable people with the surname include:

Francisco Amighetti (1907–1998), Costa Rican painter
Giovanni Amighetti (born 1971), Italian musician and composer

See also
Amighetti's Bakery, a bakery and cafe in Missouri, United States

Italian-language surnames